Achelonia is an extinct genus of marine thalassochelydian turtle. Its type species is Achelonia formosa. Fossils are known from the Upper Jurassic (late Kimmeridgian) of Wattendorf, Germany, Cerin, France, and England. Material from England was originally considered to belong to the separate genus Enaliochelys and species Enaliochelys chelonia, named by Harry Govier Seeley in 1869 for a partial disarticulated skeleton from the early Kimmeridgian of the Kimmeridge Clay in Cambridgeshire. The synonymy was recognised in 2020.

References

Thalassochelydia
Prehistoric turtle genera
Kimmeridgian genera
Late Jurassic turtles
Late Jurassic reptiles of Europe
Jurassic Germany
Fossils of Germany
Fossil taxa described in 1860
Taxa named by Christian Erich Hermann von Meyer